Nathalie Oziol (born 18 February 1990) is a French politician from La France Insoumise. She was elected as a deputy for Hérault's 2nd constituency in the 2022 French legislative election.

References

See also 

 List of deputies of the 16th National Assembly of France

Living people
1990 births
Politicians from Toulouse
21st-century French politicians
21st-century French women politicians
Deputies of the 16th National Assembly of the French Fifth Republic
La France Insoumise politicians
Women members of the National Assembly (France)
Members of Parliament for Hérault